The Baker Ministry was the 2nd Ministry of the Government of South Australia, led by Premier John Baker. It commenced on 21 August 1857 after Baker's allies defeated the Finniss Ministry in the House of Assembly. The ministry lost a confidence vote after only two days, announced that they would resign, and adjourned parliament until the formation of the Torrens Ministry on 1 September 1857. At 11 days in office, it is the third-shortest ministry in South Australian history.

Composition of ministry

References

South Australian ministries
1857 establishments in Australia